The Battle of Peiwar Kotal was fought on 2 December 1878 between British forces under Major General Frederick Roberts and Afghan forces under Karim Khan, during the opening stages of the Second Anglo-Afghan War. The British were victorious, and seized the strategic Peiwar Kotal Pass leading into the interior of Afghanistan.

The battle
After the outbreak of the Second Afghan War in November 1878, British-led forces invaded Afghanistan in three separate columns, the smallest of which was commanded by Major General Roberts. This column entered Afghanistan via the Kurram Valley on 21 November 1878, heading towards Kabul. The pass was however heavily defended at the Peiwar Kotal. This included Afghan regular forces, reinforced by local tribesman, who had established themselves in a strongly fortified position on a mountain overlooking the pass, which Robert described as an 'apparently impregnable position'.

Roberts halted and camped just outside Afghan artillery range for several days, sending out reconnaissance parties before deciding on his response. Finally, on 1 December, he ordered preparations for a frontal attack, including marking out artillery emplacements directly facing the main Afghan position. This was however a feint, and that night Roberts led the main body of his force around the flank of the Afghan defences. His attack on the morning of 2 December took the Afghans by surprise. After Roberts' forces, led by the Highlanders and Gurkhas, took a number of strongly held positions, the Afghans realised that their line of retreat was threatened and retreated from the battlefield.

Aftermath
This victory, against a well positioned superior force, opened the route to Kabul and helped lead to the Afghan government suing for peace and accepting a British Resident in Kabul, the first phase of the war ending on 26 May 1879. It also brought General Roberts, until then a little known staff officer, into public prominence, both in Britain and the wider Empire. 

Captain John Cook was awarded the Victoria Cross for his role in the battle, while his regiment, the 5th Gurkha Rifles, was awarded its first battle honour.

At least 16 cannon were captured from the Afghans. These were photographed by John Burke, who accompanied British forces.

Order of battle
The following regiments participated in the battle:

British Regiments
2nd battalion, 8th King's Regiment
72nd Highlanders (half-battalion)

Indian Regiments
12th Bengal Cavalry
2nd Punjab Infantry, Punjab Frontier Force
5th Punjab Infantry
23rd Bengal Native Infantry (Punjab Pioneers)
29th Bengal Native Infantry (Punjabis)
5th Gurkha Rifles
21st (Kohat) Mountain Battery (Frontier Force)
22nd (Derajat) Mountain Battery (Frontier Force)
Thirty-eight members of the 10th Hussars were also present.

Prior to the battle, the total strength of the force in camp was 889 Europeans, including officers, and 2,415 native Indians.

References

Sources

Conflicts in 1878
1878 in India
Battles of the Second Anglo-Afghan War
Battles involving the United Kingdom
Battles involving Afghanistan
History of Pakistan
December 1878 events